The Adriatic is the northernmost arm of the Mediterranean Sea.

Adriatic may also refer to:

Transport
 Air Adriatic, a charter airline based in Croatia

Ships
 Adriatic (ship)
 Adriatic (1810 ship), British ship wrecked in 1822
 Adriatic (1811 ship), U.S. ship seized by the British Royal Navy in 1812
 SS Adriatic (1857), the last of the Collins Line steamships
 SS Adriatic (1871), of the White Star Line
 RMS Adriatic (1906), of the White Star Line

See also
 Adriatic Plate, a tectonic plate located between the African Plate and the Eurasian Plate
 Adriatic Highway, a scenic road in Croatia and Montenegro
 Adriatic Avenue or Jadranska Avenue, an arterial highway in Zagreb, Croatia
 Jadran (disambiguation), Adriatic in South Slavic languages
 Adriatica, a Swiss watchmaking company
 Adriatico (disambiguation)